The Hawken rifle is a muzzle-loading rifle that was widely used on the prairies and in the Rocky Mountains of the United States during the early frontier days. Developed in the 1820s, it became synonymous with the "plains rifle", the buffalo gun, and the fur trapper's gun. It was displaced after the Civil War by breechloaders (such as the Sharps rifle) and lever-action rifles.

The Hawken rifle was made and sold by Jacob and Samuel Hawken. Trained by their father as rifle smiths on the East Coast, the brothers moved to St. Louis, Missouri, at the beginning of the Rocky Mountain fur trade.  Opening a gun shop in St. Louis in 1815, they developed their "Rocky Mountain Rifle" to serve the needs of fur trappers, traders, and explorers: a quality gun, light enough to carry all the time, that could knock down big animals at long range. 

In 1858, the shop passed to other owners who continued to operate and sell rifles bearing the Hawken name: William S. Hawken, William L. Watt, and J. P. Gemmer. Gemmer closed the business and retired in 1915.

History
The earliest known record of a Hawken rifle dates to 1823 when one was made for William Henry Ashley. The Hawkens did not mass-produce their rifles but rather made each one by hand, one at a time. A number of famous men were said to have owned Hawken rifles, including Auguste Lacome, Hugh Glass, Jim Bridger, Kit Carson, Orrin Porter Rockwell, Joseph Meek, Jedediah Strong Smith, and Theodore Roosevelt.

Hawken rifles had a reputation for both accuracy and long range.

The Hawken rifle company was sold in 1862, and the last rifle actually made by a Hawken was built in 1884. Although popular with mountain men and hunters of the fur trade era, up through the mid part of the 19th century, muzzleloaders were generally replaced by mass-produced, breech-loading weapons such as the Sharps rifle and the Winchester rifle.

Research data on the Hawken ("Hauken", "Hawkin") brothers and their firearm offerings can be found in The Hawken Rifle: Its Place in History by Charles E. Hanson Jr.

Design
The rifles are generally shorter and of a larger caliber than earlier "Kentucky rifles" from which they descend. The style of the rifles is the same as the Harpers Ferry Model 1803, a half stock rifle (although they also made some with full stock), with the same lines as the Kentucky rifle.  The "plains rifle" style would become the "sporter" for much of the United States during the 1840s.

Their "Rocky Mountain" guns were typically .50 caliber or .53 caliber, but ranged as high as .68 caliber.  They averaged , although there are examples of  guns. Barrels were of varying lengths (33 and 36 inch examples are described), and are octagonal on the outside and made of cast steel, which reduced fouling.  The walnut or maple stocks have a curved cheek piece, often looking like a beaver's tail and called that.  They tend to have double triggers; the rear trigger is a "set" trigger.  When the rear trigger is pulled, the hammer does not fall but rather the action "sets" the front trigger, the front trigger becoming a "hair trigger," tripped with a light touch. In many examples, when the front trigger is used without using the rear "set" trigger, it requires a firm pull, and others require the trigger to be set before the front trigger will drop the hammer at all.  The front sight was a blade sight.  Unlike many modern reproductions, the butt plate and other trim were not made of brass, but of iron.

In Karl May's Winnetou books, the eponymous Indian brave and his blood brother Old Shatterhand both owned Hawken rifles. Winnetou decorated his rifle with silver thumb tacks, and Old Shatterhand named his own gun Bear Slayer.

The 1972 film Jeremiah Johnson, starring Robert Redford as a mountain man who used such a rifle, contributed to general interest in replicas and a resurgence in the popularity of muzzleloaders among modern hunters.

References

Further reading

External links
The way to load and shoot a Hawken rifle

Guns of the American West
American Civil War rifles
Early rifles
Rifles of the United States
1823 introductions
Muzzleloaders
Hunting rifles